Fraser MacMaster (born 14  November 1978) is a retired New Zealand professional racing cyclist, who last rode for UCI Continental team . MacMaster competed in the 4000m Individual Pursuit at the 1998 Commonwealth Games where he came 6th.
Macmaster's greatest achievement is winning the overall at the Tour of Greece in 2002.

Major results
Sources:

2001
 4th Time trial, National road championships
2002
 1st  Overall Tour of Greece
1st Stage 1
 1st Porec Trophy VI
 7th Radclassic - Gleisdorf
 9th Tour du Lac Léman
2003
 3rd Overall Tour of Southland
1st Stage 10
 4th Time trial, National road championships
 5th Sacrifice Cup
2004
 9th Overall UAE International Emirates Post Tour
2005
 2nd Overall Tour of Wellington
2006
 10th Overall Tour of Southland
2007
 1st Overall K2 road race Coromandel NZ

References

External links

1978 births
Living people
New Zealand male cyclists
Cyclists from Christchurch
21st-century New Zealand people